Petricola is a genus of saltwater clams, marine bivalve molluscs in the subfamily Petricolinae of the family Veneridae, the Venus clams.

Species
According to the World Register of Marine Species database, species within the genus Petricola include:
 Petricola aequistriata G. B. Sowerby II, 1874
 Petricola angolensis Cosel, 1995
 Petricola bicolor G. B. Sowerby II, 1854
 Petricola botula Olsson, 1961
 Petricola californiensis Pilsbry and Lowe, 1932 
 Petricola carditoides (Conrad, 1837) 
 Petricola concinna G. B. Sowerby I, 1834
 Petricola dactylus (G.B. Sowerby I, 1823) 
 Petricola denticulata G. B. Sowerby I, 1834
 Petricola divergens (Gmelin, 1791) 
 Petricola exarata (Carpenter, 1857)
 Petricola fabagella Lamarck, 1818
 Petricola habei M. Huber, 2010
 Petricola hertzana Coan, 1997 
 Petricola insignis (Deshayes, 1854)
 Petricola inversa Macsotay & Villarroel, 2001
 Petricola japonica Dunker, 1882
 Petricola lapicida (Gmelin, 1791)
 Petricola linguafelis (Carpenter, 1857)
 Petricola lithophaga (Philippson, 1788)
 Petricola monstrosa (Gmelin, 1791)
 Petricola olssoni F. R. Bernard, 1983
 Petricola quadrasi (Hidalgo, 1886)
 Petricola rugosa G. B. Sowerby I, 1834
 Petricola scotti Coan, 1997
Synonyms
 Petricola brugieri Hanley : synonym of Venerupis bruguieri (Hanley, 1845)
 Petricola donnae Petuch, 1998 : synonym of Petricolaria donnae (Petuch, 1998)
 Petricola lajonkairii (Payraudeau, 1826): synonym of Lajonkairia lajonkairii (Payraudeau, 1826)
 Petricola lucasana Herlein and Strong, 1948: synonym of Petricola insignis (Deshayes, 1854)
 Petricola pholadiformis Lamarck, 1818: synonym of Petricolaria pholadiformis (Lamarck, 1818) (original combination)
 Petricola robusta G.B. Sowerby I, 1834: synonym of Choristodon robustus (G. B. Sowerby I, 1834) (original combination)

References

 Habe, T. 1951. Petricolidae, Cardiliidae and Anatinellidae in Japan. In: Kuroda, T. (ed.) Illustrated catalogue of Japanese shells.
 Coan, E. V.; Valentich-Scott, P. (2012). Bivalve seashells of tropical West America. Marine bivalve mollusks from Baja California to northern Peru. 2 vols, 1258 pp.

External links
 Lamarck, J. B. (1801). Système des animaux sans vertèbres, ou tableau général des classes, des ordres et des genres de ces animaux; Présentant leurs caractères essentiels et leur distribution, d'apres la considération de leurs rapports naturels et de leur organisation, et suivant l'arrangement établi dans les galeries du Muséum d'Histoire Naturelle, parmi leurs dépouilles conservées; Précédé du discours d'ouverture du Cours de Zoologie, donné dans le Muséum National d'Histoire Naturelle l'an 8 de la République. Published by the author and Deterville, Paris: viii + 432 pp
 Gray, J. E. (1853). A revision of the genera of some of the families of Conchifera or bivalve shells. Annals and Magazine of Natural History. (2) 11: 33-44, 398-402
 Fleuriau [de Bellevue (L.B.) 1802. Mémoire sur quelques nouveaux genres de mollusques et vers lithophages, et sur les facultés qu'ont ces animaux de percer le rochers. Journal de Physique, de Chimie, d'Histoire Naturelle et des Arts (Paris), 54: 345-369]
 Gofas, S.; Le Renard, J.; Bouchet, P. (2001). Mollusca. in: Costello, M.J. et al. (eds), European Register of Marine Species: a check-list of the marine species in Europe and a bibliography of guides to their identification. Patrimoines Naturels. 50: 180-213

Veneridae
Bivalve genera
Taxa named by Jean-Baptiste Lamarck